The University of Maine at Machias (UMaine Machias or UMM) is a public college in Machias, Maine. It is part of the University of Maine System. The institution was founded in 1909 as a normal school for educating teachers, and offers studies in recreation, English, education, social sciences, and physical sciences, including a marine biology program. Enrollment is 760 students.

History
The original name of school was the Washington State Normal School. It was later renamed to the University of Maine at Machias. The prior name is still evident in several locations on campus most prominently on Powers Hall.

In April 2016, the institution announced that it would enter into a partnership with the much larger University of Maine in Orono. The agreement included the sharing of administrators between the institutions.

Academics
The University of Maine at Machias offers 12 undergraduate majors.

Campus
The University of Maine at Machias is part of the University of Maine System. The university was founded in 1909. The campus occupies  in rural downeast coastal Maine on the Machias River.

Student life

Activities
All student organizations are run independently through an elected process with oversight by a Student Senate. Students are responsible for meetings, financial organization, and group meetings and outings.
Additionally, there are a great deal of unofficial activities on campus, ranging from hallway sports to movie nights in the lounge.  UMM offers a wide variety of activities for all manner of students.

Greek organizations
There are seven Greek organizations on campus, four fraternities and three sororities. Some organizations are nationally affiliated, while others are local and exist solely at the University of Maine at Machias. All groups are run independently and jointly form Greek Council, which oversees Greek life as a whole. The recognized Greek fraternities on campus are Psi Delta (a local chapter of the Alpha Delta), Kappa Mu Alpha, Sigma Chi Lambda, and Omicron Delta Pi (a co-ed fraternal organization). The sororities located on campus are Epsilon Sigma Alpha, Kappa Alpha Kappa, and Phi Tau Phi.

Sunrise Senior College
The University of Maine at Machias is the home of Sunrise Senior College, which is one of 16 enrichment experience institutions in Maine for people 50 and over and their partners of any age. Founded in 2002 as part of the Maine Senior College Network, Sunrise Senior College offers most of its classes on the UMM campus. SSC has fall and spring semesters, but they only generally follow UMM's semesters—all of the SSC courses are shorter. The courses are not for credit, are taught by volunteers with expertise in their areas, and no one needs to be a college (or even high school) graduate to attend.

Maine Blackfly Breeders Association Annual Convention
The University of Maine at Machias has for many years been host to the annual Maine Blackfly Breeders Association convention in March. Convention-goers are asked to bring limericks, jokes, stories and songs for annual contests. Exhibits, art, crafts and other items also are sought. Special guests in March 2009 were members of the UMM Ukulele Club. Bloody Merry, an 8-foot-long black fly who made her debut at the 2007 convention, was in attendance, gently flapping her wings and posing for admirers. Breeders also heard the latest buzz on the association’s attempts at establishing a blackfly farm in Washington County, first discussed at last year’s event. (The blackfly farm would harness the power of black flies to provide renewable energy.)

Athletics
Maine–Machias (UMM) athletic teams were the Clippers. The university was a member of the United States Collegiate Athletic Association (USCAA), primarily competing in the Yankee Small College Conference (YSCC) from 2011–12 to 2019–20. The Clippers previously participated in the Sunrise Athletic Conference of the National Association of Intercollegiate Athletics (NAIA) from 2002–03 to 2010–11.

Maine–Machias (UMM) competed in five intercollegiate varsity sports: Men's sports included basketball and soccer; while women's sports included basketball, soccer and volleyball.

Suspension
On July 21st, 2020, Machias suspended all sports due to financial losses and the ongoing COVID-19 pandemic.

Clubs/intramurals
The university also offers several club and intramural sports.

References

External links
 Official website
 Official athletics website 

 
Educational institutions established in 1909
Machias, Maine
University of Maine System
University of Maine at Machias
Universities and colleges in Washington County, Maine
USCAA member institutions
1909 establishments in Maine
University of Maine Machias